Gilak Mahalleh-ye Alalan (also Romanized as Gīlak Maḩalleh-ye Ālālān; also known as Gīlakmaḩalleh) is a village in Asalem Rural District, Asalem District, Talesh County, Gilan Province, Iran. At the 2006 census, its population was 400, in 93 families.

References 

Populated places in Talesh County